Banksia ashbyi, commonly known as Ashby's banksia, is a species of shrub or small tree that is endemic to Western Australia. It has smooth, grey bark, deeply serrated, hairy leaves and spikes of bright orange flowers.

Description
It has smooth, grey bark and young stems that are hairy at first but become glabrous as they age.

Taxonomy and naming
Banksia ashbyi was first formally described in 1934 by Edmund Gilbert Baker in the Journal of Botany, British and Foreign. The specific epithet honours Edwin Ashby, one of the collectors of the type specimens.

In 2008, Alex George described two subspecies in the journal Nuytsia  and the names have been accepted by the Australian Plant Census:

Distribution and habitat
Ashby's banksia grows in heath and spinifex country along the coast of Western Australia between Geraldton and Exmouth. Subspecies ashbyi occurs between Shark Bay and Coorow as well as in the Kennedy Range. Subspecies boreoscaia is found further north, between North West Cape and Quobba.

Conservation status
This banksia is classified as "not threatened" by the Western Australian Government Department of Parks and Wildlife.

Ecology
An assessment of the potential impact of climate change on this species found that its range is unlikely to contract and may actually grow, depending on how effectively it migrates into newly habitable areas.

Use in horticulture
Seeds do not require any treatment, and take 16 to 61 days to germinate.

References

External links

ashbyi
Eudicots of Western Australia
Endemic flora of Western Australia
Plants described in 1934